The 1994 California Angels season involved the Angels finishing 4th in the American League West with a record of 47 wins and 68 losses. The season was cut short by the 1994 player's strike.

Offseason
December 9, 1993: Spike Owen was traded by the New York Yankees with cash to the California Angels for Jose Musset (minors).
January 28, 1994: Shawn Hillegas was signed as a free agent with the California Angels.
January 31, 1994: Bo Jackson was signed as a free agent with the California Angels.
March 28, 1994: Rex Hudler was signed as a free agent with the California Angels.

Regular season

By Friday, August 12, the Angels had compiled a 47–68 record through 115 games. They had scored 543 runs (4.72 per game) and allowed 660 runs (5.74 per game).

Season standings

Record vs. opponents

Transactions
April 1, 1994: Torey Lovullo was selected off waivers by the Seattle Mariners from the California Angels.

Roster

Player stats

Batting
Note: Pos = Position; G = Games played; AB = At bats; H = Hits; Avg. = Batting average; HR = Home runs; RBI = Runs batted in

Other batters
Note: G = Games played; AB = At bats; H = Hits; Avg. = Batting average; HR = Home runs; RBI = Runs batted in

Starting pitchers
Note: G = Games pitched; IP = Innings pitched; W = Wins; L = Losses; ERA = Earned run average; SO = Strikeouts

Other pitchers
Note: G = Games pitched; IP = Innings pitched; W = Wins; L = Losses; ERA = Earned run average; SO = Strikeouts

Relief pitchers
Note: G = Games pitched; W = Wins; L = Losses; SV = Saves; ERA = Earned run average; SO = Strikeouts

Farm system

LEAGUE CHAMPIONS: Cedar Rapids, Boise

References

1994 California Angels at Baseball Reference
1994 California Angels  at Baseball Almanac

Los Angeles Angels seasons
California Angels season
Los